Nationality words link to articles with information on the nation's poetry or literature (for instance, Irish or France).

Events
June – While waiting to cross the English Channel on honeymoon, English poet Matthew Arnold probably begins to compose the poem "Dover Beach" (published 1867).

Works published in English

United Kingdom
 Thomas Lovell Beddoes, Poems Posthumous and Collected
 Edward Henry Bickersteth, Nineveh
 Elizabeth Barrett Browning, Casa Guidi Windows
 Caroline Clive, under the pen name "V", The Valley of the Rea
 Hartley Coleridge, Poems by Hartley Coleridge, edited by Derwent Coleridge (posthumous)
 George Meredith, Poems, including the first version of "Love in the Valley"

United States
 Thomas Holley Chivers, Eonchs of Ruby: A Gift of Love
 Theodore Sedgwick Fay, Ulric; or, The Voices
 Henry Wadsworth Longfellow, The Golden Legend (republished under the title Christius 1872)
 William Wilberforce Lord, Christ in Hades
 Henry Theodore Tuckerman, Poems
 Frances Fuller Victor, with Metta Victoria Victor, Poems of Sentiment and Imagination
 William Ross Wallace, Meditations in America, and Other Poems

Works published in other languages
 Hilario Ascasubi, Santos Vega o los mellizos de la Flor, Spanish-language, Argentina
 Heinrich Heine, Romanzero, Germany
 Micah Joseph Lebensohn, Shire Bat Ẓiyyon, Hebrew-language, Lithuania

Births
Dath years link to the corresponding "[year] in poetry" article:
 March 1 – Arthur Clement Hilton (died 1877), English
 May 8 – James Lister Cuthbertson (died 1910), Australian
 December 18 – John Farrell (died 1904), Australian
 December 20 – Thérèse Schwartze (died 1918), Dutch portrait painter and poet
 Date not known – Albery Allson Whitman (died 1901), African American

Deaths
Birth years link to the corresponding "[year] in poetry" article:
 February 1 – Mary Shelley (born 1797), English novelist, short story writer, dramatist, essayist, biographer, travel writer and poet
 February 23 – Joanna Baillie (born 1762), Scottish poet and dramatist
 July 6 – David Macbeth Moir (born 1798), Scottish physician and writer
 October 31 (October 19 O.S.) – Petar II Petrović-Njegoš (born 1813), Serbian poet and Prince-Bishop of Montenegro
 December 19 – Henry Luttrell (born 1768), English politician, wit and writer of society verse

See also

 19th century in poetry
 19th century in literature
 List of years in poetry
 List of years in literature
 Victorian literature
 French literature of the 19th century
 Poetry

Notes

19th-century poetry
Poetry